The Chief of the General Staff of Armenian Armed Forces is the highest-ranking military officer of the Armed Forces of Armenia, who is responsible for maintaining the operational command of the military and its three major branches.

List of Chiefs

See also
Armenian Armed Forces
Ministry of Defence of Armenia
Armenian Army
Armenian Air Force

References

Chiefs of the General Staff (Armenia)